Malar flush is a plum-red discolouration of the high cheeks. It is classically associated with mitral valve stenosis due to the resulting CO2 retention and its vasodilatory effects. It can also be associated with lupus, polycythemia vera and homocystinuria.

Definition 
Malar flush is a plum-red discolouration of the high cheeks.

Pathophysiology 
Mitral valve stenosis may cause malar flush due to CO2 retention, which causes vasodilation of arterioles in the cheeks.

It can also be associated with other conditions, such as lupus, polycythemia vera and homocystinuria.

See also 
 Malar rash

References

Valvular heart disease
Symptoms and signs: Circulatory system